Andrija Popović (born 22 September 1959) is a Montenegrin nationalist and liberal politician and former professional water polo player. He is the president of the Liberal Party of Montenegro. Popović lives in Kotor, Montenegro-

Sports career 
Popovic is one of Montenegrin athletes with the highest number of medals. He was a member of the water polo team of Yugoslavia and winner of the gold medal at the 1984 Summer Olympics, the gold medal at the World Championships in 1986, and the silver medal at the European Championships in 1985 and 1987. While playing for the ”Mladost”, Zagreb he won two European Champions Cup in 1989/90 and 1990/91. He was awarded as the best athlete of Montenegro in 1985. He is Vice President of the Montenegrin Olympic Committee and president of the Montenegrin Olympians Club.

Political career 
He started his political career in the Liberal Alliance of Montenegro (LSCG) as coordinator for sport. After decision of Liberal Alliance of Montenegro to freeze its work in 2005, Popović opted to join the party's ex-members who were formerly excluded from LSCG due to corruption charges,  gathered around the newly formed Liberal Party of Montenegro (LP) led by Miodrag Živković.

He was a member of the Parliament of Montenegro in 2008-2009. After the 2009 parliamentary elections LP lost its parliamentary status and the old leadership of LP together with its leader Miodrag Živković resigned during the extraordinary conference of the Liberal Party on 20 June 2009. Following this decision, Popović was elected as President of LP. He was a member of the Council of the European Movement for Independent Montenegro at the state and municipal level.

At the 2012 parliamentary elections LP entered the coalition with governing parties DPS and SDP, thus gaining one seat in the Parliament, which was occupied by Popović.
Due to internal disagreements, Liberal Party froze its membership in the Coalition for European Montenegro, and is acting in the Parliament in the group with the minority parties (Croatian and Albanian minority representatives). However, this change has been only formal, because the minority group is also an integral part of the ruling majority. During the Fourth Regular Conference of the Liberal Party of Montenegro that was held on 14 September 2013, Popović has been re-elected as President of the Liberal Party of Montenegro.

See also
 Yugoslavia men's Olympic water polo team records and statistics
 List of Olympic champions in men's water polo
 List of Olympic medalists in water polo (men)
 List of men's Olympic water polo tournament goalkeepers
 List of world champions in men's water polo
 List of World Aquatics Championships medalists in water polo

References

External links
 

1959 births
Living people
People from Kotor
Montenegrin male water polo players
Yugoslav male water polo players
Water polo goalkeepers
Water polo players at the 1984 Summer Olympics
Olympic water polo players of Yugoslavia
Olympic gold medalists for Yugoslavia
Medalists at the 1984 Summer Olympics
Olympic medalists in water polo
Montenegrin politicians
Liberal Party of Montenegro politicians